The 2014–15 season was Maribor's 55th season of football and the club's 24th consecutive season in the Slovenian PrvaLiga since the league establishment in 1991.

After the 2013–14 season when Maribor won the PrvaLiga and Supercup titles, the club continued with their dominance in domestic competitions during the 2014–15 season and has managed to add another two titles among club honours; they have won their 13th league and their fourth supercup title. Unlike the previous season, when Maribor were runners-up in the Slovenian Football Cup, this season Maribor was knocked out from the competition one round earlier when Celje defeated them 3–2 on aggregate during the semi-final of the 2014–15 Slovenian Football Cup. The club did particularly well in the UEFA competitions where they went undefeated during six matches of the 2014–15 UEFA Champions League qualifying campaign and, for the first time in 15 years, have managed to secure a spot among the elite 32 clubs in the competition proper. There the club was drawn into a group with Chelsea, Schalke, and Sporting, and has managed to draw each of them once, winning a total of three points in the process. For manager Ante Šimundža this was the second time he had a taste of the elite competition with Maribor, as he was the club's player during their 1999–2000 campaign.

Team captain Marcos Tavares was the club's top scorer during the season with 19 goals, 17 of which were scored in the Slovenian PrvaLiga where he was crowned the league's top scorer for the third time. The Brazilian made history in late August 2014 when he scored the winning goal during the second leg of the UEFA Champions League play-off round against Celtic. He has also entered a small group of six players who have scored more than 100 goals in the PrvaLiga. By the end of the 2014–15 season Tavares has netted 102 goals in 240 PrvaLiga appearances. During the course of the season Maribor maintained an average league attendance of 4,406 on its home matches. This was the first time in almost two decades that the club's home average league attendance exceeded 4,000 spectators per match.

Supercup

Colour key: Green = Maribor win; Yellow = draw; Red = opponents win.

Slovenian League

Standings

Results summary

Results by round

Matches

Colour key: Green = Maribor win; Yellow = draw; Red = opponents win.

Notes

Slovenian Cup

Colour key: Green = Maribor win; Yellow = draw; Red = opponents win.

Notes

UEFA Champions League

Second qualifying round

Colour key: Green = Maribor win; Yellow = draw; Red = opponents win.

Third qualifying round

Colour key: Green = Maribor win; Yellow = draw; Red = opponents win.

Notes

Play-off round

Colour key: Green = Maribor win; Yellow = draw; Red = opponents win.

Group G

Colour key: Green = Maribor win; Yellow = draw; Red = opponents win.

Friendlies

Colour key: Green = Maribor win; Yellow = draw; Red = opponents win.

Squad statistics

Key

Players
No.     = Shirt number
Pos.    = Playing position
GK      = Goalkeeper
DF      = Defender
MF      = Midfielder
FW      = Forward

Nationality
 = Bosnia and Herzegovina
 = Brazil
 = Croatia
 = France
 = Israel
 = Macedonia
 = Montenegro
 = Senegal
 = Slovenia
 = Ukraine

Competitions
Apps    = Appearances
 = Yellow card
 = Red card

Foreign players
Below is the list of foreign players who have made appearances for the club during the 2014–15 season. Players primary citizenship is listed first.

EU Nationals
  Sven Dodlek
 Matko Obradović
 Jean-Philippe Mendy

EU Nationals (Dual citizenship)
  Arghus
  Marcos Tavares

Non-EU Nationals
 Nusmir Fajić
 Agim Ibraimi
 Welle N'Diaye
 Dudu Biton
 Sintayehu Sallalich

Appearances and goals
Correct as of 30 May 2015, match v. Koper. Flags indicate national team as has been defined under FIFA eligibility rules. Players may hold more than one non-FIFA nationality. The players squad numbers, playing positions, nationalities and statistics are based solely on match reports in Matches sections above and the official website of NK Maribor and the Slovenian PrvaLiga. Only the players, which made at least one appearance for the first team, are listed.

Discipline
Correct as of 30 May 2015, match v. Koper. Flags indicate national team as has been defined under FIFA eligibility rules. Players may hold more than one non-FIFA nationality. The players squad numbers, playing positions, nationalities and statistics are based solely on match reports in Matches sections above and the official website of NK Maribor and the Slovenian PrvaLiga. If a player received two yellow cards in a match and was subsequently sent off the numbers count as two yellow cards, one red card.

Transfers and loans

Summer transfer window

Winter transfer window

See also
List of NK Maribor seasons

References

NK Maribor seasons
Maribor
Maribor